The 2017–18 season was Al-Wehda's first season back in Prince Mohammad bin Salman League following their relegation last season and their 73rd year in existence. Along with the Prince Mohammad bin Salman League, the club also competed in the King Cup. The season covered the period from 1 July 2017 to 30 June 2018.

Players

Squad information

Transfers

In

Out

Pre-season friendlies

Competitions

Prince Mohammad bin Salman League

League table

Results summary

Results by matchday

Matches
All times are local, AST (UTC+3).

King Cup

Al-Wehda entered the King Cup in the Round of 32. They were eliminated in the first round after losing to Al-Nojoom.
All times are local, AST (UTC+3).

Statistics

Squad statistics
As of 18 April 2018.

|}

Goalscorers

Last Updated: 18 April 2018

Clean sheets

Last Updated: 18 April 2018

References

Al-Wehda Club (Mecca) seasons
Wehda